Catecahassa or Black Hoof (c. 1740 – 1831) was the head civil chief of the Shawnee Indians in the Ohio Country of what became the United States. A member of the Mekoche division of the Shawnees, Black Hoof became known as a fierce warrior during the early wars between the Shawnee and encroaching American settlers. Black Hoof claimed to have been present at the Battle of the Monongahela in 1755, when General Edward Braddock was defeated during the French and Indian War, although there is no contemporary evidence that Shawnees took part in that battle.

Little documentary evidence of Black Hoof's life appears in the historical record before 1795. As a child he may have been a member of a wandering band of some 400 Shawnees led by Peter Chartier between 1745 and 1748, who founded the community in Kentucky called Eskippakithiki and later moved to Sylacauga, Alabama, eventually settling in Old Shawneetown, Illinois. He probably took part in the Battle of Point Pleasant during Lord Dunmore's War against the Virginia militia in 1774. During the American Revolutionary War, he may have taken part in the siege of Boonesborough in 1778, which was led by Chief Blackfish, as well as the subsequent defense of the Shawnee village of Chillicothe in 1779. In the Northwest Indian War, Black Hoof was defeated by "Mad" Anthony Wayne and, following the collapse of the Indian confederation, surrendered in 1795.

Like Little Turtle of the Miamis, Black Hoof decided that American Indians needed to adapt culturally to the ways of the whites in order to prevent decimation through warfare. During his later years, Black Hoof became an ally of the United States and was responsible for keeping the majority of the Shawnee nation from joining Tecumseh's War, which became part of the War of 1812.

Black Hoof resisted the policy of Indian removal that the United States implemented soon after the War of 1812. He never signed a removal treaty, and continued to lead his tribe until his death in Saint Johns, Ohio in 1831. After his death, the Shawnee were eventually compelled to emigrate to the West.

References

Grant, Bruce. Concise Encyclopedia of the American Indian, 3rd ed., Wings Books: New York, 2000.

External links
 Address of Black Hoof to President Thomas Jefferson, 5 February 1802 at National Archives

People from Auglaize County, Ohio
Native Americans in the American Revolution
Native American leaders
Native American people of the Indian Wars
18th-century Shawnee people
19th-century Shawnee people
1740 births
1831 deaths
Wapakoneta, Ohio